Mass gatherings are events attended by a sufficient number of people to strain the planning and response resources of the host community, state/province, nation, or region where it is being held.    Definitions of a mass gathering generally include the following:
 Planned (long term or spontaneously planned) event
 “a specified number of persons (at least >1000 persons).
 at a specific location, for a specific purpose (e.g. social function, public event, sporting event) for a defined period of time”.
 Requires Multi-Agency Coordination 
Mass gatherings are usually sporting events (such as Olympic Games) or religious pilgrimages (such as Kumbh Mela or Arba'een Pilgrimage). They are highly visible  and in some cases, millions of people attend them.

Statistics 

Here is some Statistics about the latest mass gatherings in the world:

2022:

July: Hajj in Mecca: 1 million 

September: Arba'een Pilgrimage in Karbala: 21 million 

2020-2021:

No more mass gathering due to COVID-19

2020:

January: Qasem Soleimani's funeral in  Tehran: 7 million 

2019:

January: Kumbh Mela in Allahabad: 14 million 

February: Kumbh Mela in Allahabad: 50 million 

August: Hajj in Mecca: 2.5 million 

October: Arba'een Pilgrimage in Karbala: 18 million 

Mass Gathering Medicine  is  a new field of medicine that focuses on the health risks of mass gatherings.   The World Health Organization through its "Department of Global Alert and Response" supports Member States hosting mass gatherings and regularly receives a large number of requests for technical support by countries organizing large mass gatherings.

See also
 Flash mob
 List of largest peaceful gatherings
 Mass movement
 Protests

References

Social groups